The 1978 Dutch Grand Prix was a Formula One motor race held at Zandvoort on 27 August 1978. It was the 13th race of the 1978 Formula One season. It was the final career victory for Mario Andretti, who went on to win the championship after Ronnie Peterson's fatal crash at Monza.

Report

For the fourth consecutive race, the Lotuses came 1–2 in qualifying with Mario Andretti ahead of Ronnie Peterson. Niki Lauda was third in the Brabham, ahead of the Ferraris of Carlos Reutemann and Gilles Villeneuve. The top ten was completed by Jacques Laffite in the Ligier, James Hunt in the McLaren, John Watson in the second Brabham, Jean-Pierre Jabouille in the Renault, and Emerson Fittipaldi in the Fittipaldi.

At the start of the race, Andretti led from Peterson with Laffite charging up to third, while at the second corner Didier Pironi's Tyrrell collided with Riccardo Patrese's Arrows. Thereafter, the race was relatively uneventful, Peterson dutifully following Andretti while Laffite fell back down the order, enabling Lauda to reclaim third. At the end, Andretti was just over three-tenths of a second ahead of Peterson, with Lauda a further 12 seconds back; the minor points went to Watson, Fittipaldi and Villeneuve.

This fourth 1–2 finish of the season for Lotus meant that, with three races left to run, only Andretti or Peterson could take the Drivers' Championship. It would go to Andretti in the next race at Monza, when Peterson crashed fatally.

Classification

Pre-qualifying 

*Positions in red indicate entries that failed to pre-qualify.

Qualifying

*Positions in red indicate entries that failed to qualify.

Race

Championship standings after the race 

Drivers' Championship standings

Constructors' Championship standings

Note: Only the top five positions are included for both sets of standings.

References

Dutch Grand Prix
Dutch Grand Prix
Grand Prix
Dutch Grand Prix